SS Stepas Darius was a Liberty ship built in the United States during World War II. She was named after Steponas Darius, a Lithuanian American pilot, who died in a non-stop flight attempt with Lituanica from New York City to Kaunas, Lithuania, in 1933.

Construction 
Stepas Darius was laid down on 14 August 1944, under a Maritime Commission (MARCOM) contract, MC hull 2320, by J.A. Jones Construction, Panama City, Florida; sponsored by Mrs. Harley Ferguson, wife of assistant general manager JAJCC; and launched on 25 September 1944.

History
She was allocated to William J. Rountree Company, 9 October 1944. On 27 June 1946, she was laid up in the National Defense Reserve Fleet, in James River Reserve Fleet, Lee Hall, Virginia.

She was sold, on 10 January 1947, to Compania de Navegacion Phocena de Panama, for $562,854.89 and commercial use, she was renamed Mando. She was withdrawn from the fleet on 15 January 1947.

She was declared a total loss.

Wreck located at:

References

Bibliography 

 
 
 
 

 

Liberty ships
Ships built in Panama City, Florida
1944 ships
James River Reserve Fleet
Wreck diving sites in the United Kingdom
Maritime incidents in 1955